Romance Full of Life is a 6-episode South Korean television drama starring Yoon Shi-yoon and Cho Soo-hyang. The drama is one of the "Three Color Fantasy" drama trilogy by MBC. The drama's color is Green. It was preceded by The Universe's Star (White) and it will be followed by Queen of the Ring (Gold). It aired on Naver TV Cast every Tuesday at 0:00 (KST) starting from February 14, and on MBC every Thursday at 23:10 (KST) starting from February 16, 2017.

Plot 
Story about So In-sung (Yoon Shi-yoon) a dork looking guy, who has been preparing for the examination to become a police officer for 4 years. Despite failing the exam 8 times, In-sung has a positive personality. He then applies for a high paying part-time job called "Experiment Full of Life" and becomes a super-hero and all the ladies fall for him .

Cast

Main 
 Yoon Shi-yoon as So In-sung 
 Cho Soo-hyang as Wang So-ra

Supporting 
 Kang Ki-young as Jo Ji-sub
 Kim Min-soo as Gong Moo
 Jang Hee-ryung as Kim Tae-yi
 Hwang Young-hee as In-sung's mother
 Ji Dae-han as Convenience store manager
 Kim Ji-eun as Student
 Woo Do-im as Song Ae-kyo
 Lee Jin-kwon as Supporting

Others 
 Kim Ji-eun as Nurse (ep. #1-2)

Special appearance 
 Woo Hyeon as In-sung's father
 Kim Seul-gi as Fisherwoman (ep.6)

Production 
The drama is pre-produced and a co-production between Naver and iMBC.

This drama marks the directing debut of the director Park Sang-hoon and his second work after directing the movie A Mere Life. The screenwriter Park Eun-young is known for his drama Hwarang: The Poet Warrior Youth.

First script reading took place in September, 2016 at MBC Broadcasting Station in Sangam, South Korea.

Ratings 
 In the table below, the blue numbers represent the lowest ratings and the red numbers represent the highest ratings.
 NR denotes that the drama did not rank in the top 20 daily programs on that date.

References

External links 
 

2017 South Korean television series debuts
MBC TV television dramas
South Korean romantic fantasy television series
Korean-language television shows
Naver TV original programming
2017 South Korean television series endings
Examinations and testing in fiction